Thomas Valpy French (1 January 1825 – 14 May 1891) was an English Christian Missionary in India and Persia, who became the first Bishop of Lahore, in 1877, and also founded the St. John's College, Agra, in 1853.

After Henry Martyn, French is considered the second most important Christian missionary to the Middle East.

Early life and education

Thomas Valpy French was born on New Year's Day in 1825, in Abbey, Burton upon Trent, Staffordshire, England, the son of Rev. Peter French and his wife, Penelope Arabella the daughter of the educationalist, Richard Valpy of Reading, Berkshire. Thomas' father was vicar of Holy Trinity Church, Reading, for forty-seven years, and he grew up in the house, which was once part of the Benedictine Abbey, on the banks of the River Trent.

French started his schooling at Reading Grammar School, and at age fourteen, he joined Rugby School. In 1843, he won a scholarship to the University College, Oxford, where he was made a fellow in 1848. It was at Oxford that he first felt called to mission in India.

Missionary career
On 16 April 1850 French joined the missionary service of Church Missionary Society, and was sent to Agra, India. He set sail to India on East Indian Queen on 11 September 1850 and reached Calcutta on 2 January 1851.

Soon French headed off to Agra, where he was appointed for educational work. He founded the St. John's College at Agra, which formally opened in 1853, though he had started taking classes in small room with ten boys, while the college building was being built. The college was named as St. John's, after the college of another noted missionary, Henry Martyn (1781–1812) at Cambridge. He also learnt seven languages, including Hindustani, Punjabi, Urdu, Persian, Pashto and Arabic to properly administer the school, as he also became school's first principal, and a post he held until the end of his seven-year stay at Agra.

Later French married Miss Mary Anne Janson, whom he had met at Oxford, and one of his eight children, Ellen Penelope French (1854–1892), went on to marry Edmund Arbuthnott Knox, fourth Bishop of Manchester, (1903–1921).

1861 saw French moving to the Punjab, where he started a new mission, which was the first in the area, though bad health forced him to leave for England by the end of 1862. He arrived back in Britain on 7 February 1863.

In 1877, on St. Thomas' Day at Westminster Abbey, London, French was appointed the first Anglican Bishop of a large new diocese of Lahore, which included, all of the Punjab and northwestern India, and remained so until 1887, during the time he founded the Lahore Divinity College, which opened on 21 November 1870 and also remained its Principal for many years, he supervised the translation of the Bible and Prayer Book into Hindustani and Pashto, and also made visits to Kashmir and Iran (1883), where he was the first Episcopal bishop to visit the country, before returning to England, due to bad health in 1887.

French reached Muscat, on his final missionary work, on 8 February 1891 and became the first missionary to visit the region; he had just started setting up his work there, when his health started failing, and having been cared for by Portuguese Catholics he died on 14 May 1891 in Muscat, Oman and was buried in a Christian cemetery.

Legacy
In 2007, Rowan Douglas Williams, the Archbishop of Canterbury, hailed French as a personal hero. Williams again wrote of French in his 2016 book Being Disciples, saying of him that although he "seems to have made no converts" during his final years in the Middle East, he was not there primarily to make converts but out of "the desire to be where Jesus was ... to be in the company of Jesus Christ".

References

Further reading
 The Life and correspondence of Thomas Valpy French, first bishop of Lahore by Herbert Alfred Birks. 2 vols, London, J. Murray, 1895.
 An Heroic Bishop: The Life-Story of French of Lahore An Heroic Bishop: The Life-Story of French of Lahore, by Eugene Stock. London, New York and Toronto: Hodder and Stoughton, 1913. Online
 Biography Thomas Valpy French: First Bishop of Lahore by Vivienne Stacey, Christian Study Centre, (1982) (English and Urdu).

External links
 An Heroic Bishop : the life-story of French of Lahore (1913), Online
 Thomas Valpy French at Boston University digilibrary

1825 births
1891 deaths
People from Burton upon Trent
People educated at Rugby School
Alumni of University College, Oxford
Fellows of University College, Oxford
English Anglican missionaries
Anglican missionaries in Pakistan
Anglican missionaries in India
Anglican missionaries in Iran
19th-century Anglican bishops in Asia
Anglican bishops of Lahore
People educated at Reading School
Deaths in Oman